Onychogomphus malabarensis is a species of dragonfly in the family Gomphidae. It is endemic to the streams of Western Ghats of India.

The species is known from a single specimen collected by T.N. Hearsey in 1921 from Palakkad. The species may be collected from forests around Palakkad.

See also
 List of odonates of India
 List of odonata of Kerala

References

Gomphidae
Insects described in 1924